Kamosia is a genus of beetles in the family Buprestidae, containing the following species:

 Kamosia abyssinica Kerremans, 1899
 Kamosia aethiopica (Kerremans, 1913)
 Kamosia alluaudi Kerremans, 1903
 Kamosia andreinii Kerremans, 1907
 Kamosia arrowi (Obenberger, 1924)
 Kamosia duvivieri Kerremans, 1898
 Kamosia indigacea (Obenberger, 1924)
 Kamosia infernalis (Obenberger, 1924)
 Kamosia jakobsoni Obenberger, 1935
 Kamosia kraatzi (Kerremans, 1899)
 Kamosia margotana Novak, 2010
 Kamosia mirabilis (Obenberger, 1919)
 Kamosia muelleri Obenberger, 1940
 Kamosia schultzei Kerremans, 1907
 Kamosia subinduta (Wallengren, 1881)
 Kamosia tenebricosa (Peringuey, 1908)
 Kamosia turneri Thery, 1941
 Kamosia vansoni Obenberger, 1935
 Kamosia zonata (Kerremans, 1914)

References

Buprestidae genera